"It's Only Love" is a song written by Morris Levy, Ritchie Cordell, and Sal Trimachi and recorded by Tommy James and the Shondells for their 1966 album, It's Only Love. Levy, the owner of Roulette Records (Tommy James and the Shondells' label) often insisted that he receive a writing credit on songs in order to receive royalty payments.  The song reached #31 on The Billboard Hot 100 in 1966. The song also reached #10 in Canada.

The original B-side was "Don't Let My Love Pass You By." Later releases included a remake of Lee Dorsey's song "Ya Ya".

References

1966 songs
1966 singles
Tommy James and the Shondells songs
Songs written by Morris Levy
Songs written by Ritchie Cordell
Roulette Records singles